Jonas Folts (March 12, 1808 – June 24, 1876) was an American farmer and politician.

Born in Herkimer, New York, Folts moved to Milwaukee, Michigan Territory in 1835 and then moved to the town of Summit in 1836. In 1843, Folts moved to Hebron, Wisconsin Territory. He was a farmer and bookkeeper. He served as register of deeds in 1846 for Jefferson County and then in the second Wisconsin Constitutional Convention of 1847–1848. Then, in 1868, Folts served in the Wisconsin State Assembly and was a Democrat. Folts also served as town clerk and town board chairman He died in Hebron, Wisconsin.

Notes

1808 births
1876 deaths
People from Herkimer, New York
People from Jefferson County, Wisconsin
Businesspeople from Wisconsin
Farmers from Wisconsin
Mayors of places in Wisconsin
19th-century American politicians
People from Summit, Waukesha County, Wisconsin
Democratic Party members of the Wisconsin State Assembly